Gajaman, sometimes referred to as Camillus' Gajaman 3D, is a 2023 Sri Lankan Sinhala 3D animation comedy film directed by Chanaka Perera and co-produced by John Fonseka and Chamika Jinadasa for Studio 101. The film makes the hallmark in Sri Lankan cinema industry by becoming the first ever three dimensional (3D) animation movie in Sri Lanka using motion capture technology. The two lead characters of the film was dubbed by popular dubbing artist duet, Suneth Chitrananda and Gaminda Priyaviraj. Other cast includes, Rashi Prabodha, Yureni Noshika and Sunil Perera. Background score composed by Ravihans Wetakepotha and  songs composed by Anushka Udana (Wasthi Productions). Sound designing & re-recording mixing was accomplished by Nisal Gangodage.

The motion capture cast includes Dasun Pathirana, Paboda Sandeepani and many newcomers. Film trailer was released at a press conference held at the National Film Corporation's Tharangani Cinema in April 2018.

The movie was theatrically released on 27 January 2023 after having a limited release seven days earlier.

Plot
The film opens with Gajaman's house in the morning. In his bedroom, he wakes up and gets his foot stuck in a mousetrap. Afterwards he continues to live his normal routine and goes to Magodis's mansion where he informs Gajaman to pick up his daughter Padmavathi from the airport which results in humorous circumstances. Afterwards he returns some of his friends home to put posters of Magodis in the middle of the night.

Cast
 Gaminda Priyaviraj as Gajaman
 Suneth Chithrananda as Amda
 Rashi Prabodha
 Yureni Noshika as Sweety
 Dasun Pathirana
 Paboda Sandeepani as Padmawathi
 Sunil Perera as Minister Magodis
 Janindu Mahesh
 Chamara Sampath 
 Pradeep Ramawickrama
 Kasuni Kavindi
 Sharadha Pathirage

Songs 

 Man Thaniwama (Sinhala: මං තනිවම) - Artist: Dinesh Gamage
 Pichchamal Wassakin (Sinhala: පිච්ච මල් වැස්සකින්) - Artist: Ridma Weerawardena
 Bombe Motai (Sinhala: බොම්බෙ මොටයි) - Artist: Anushka Udana ft Sunil Perera

References

External links
 
 Gajaman on YouTube
 Concept of Hasara

Sinhala-language films
3D Entertainment films
Sri Lankan 3D films